Raja Puran Mal (r. 1529-1542) was a Jat ruler of Chanderi and Raisen, now in Madhya Pradesh, India, during the Mughal period and the Suri dynasty. He was the son of Raja Silhadi and princess of  Mewar , Rani Durgavati.

He defeated Babur's Mughal army at Chanderi in 1529 and occupied the Chanderi Fort. Negotiations were made after Sher Shah Suri's attack on the fort in 1542  but Puran Mal was killed by conspiracists.

Conflict with Babur
Babur attacked India in 1527 and rajput kings of rajasthan under the leadership of Rana Sanga of Mewar failed to stop him in Battle of Khanwa. Babur captured a great territory of India included chanderi. He used to treat the Hindus of Chanderi very badly. That was why Puran Mal attacked on Chanderi in 1529 and defeated Mughal Army of Babur and captured chanderi fort. After this defeat the Mughals left chanderi and Puran Mal took over control of Chanderi .

Conflict with Sher Shah Suri
The Mughal Empire was defeated by Sur Empire of Sher Shah Suri.

In 1542, Sher Shah added Malwa to his empire. During this campaign, he ordered his amir Shujaat Khan to bring Puran Mal to his presence. Shujaat Khan conducted Puran Mal, who had taken with him 6,000 horsemen before Sher Shah, who at once presented his new ally with a hundred horses and a hundred splendid robes of honour and then sent him home. Puran Mai set out for the return journey to Raisen leaving his brother Chaturbhuj in the service of Sher Shah. This arrangement soon went awry .In 1543, a year after the understanding between the Afghan sultan and the Puran Mal, Sher Shah took Chanderi from Puran Mal and then laid siege to his stronghold Raisen. As his motive for this campaign Sher Shah is said to have given vent to his anger with Puran Mal, ‘who had made captives the families of the Muslims in Chanderi, had forcibly made their daughters to be the dancing-girls and had not co-operated with his son. The siege continued for six months with the fort coming under heavy bombardment. Artillery proved to be the deciding factor and Puran Mal had to negotiate once again with Sher Shah. The negotiations were soon successful. Sher Shah granted to Puran Mal the iqta of Benares.

Death
A little afterwards the negotiation, a number of Muslim women of Chanderi presented themselves before Sher Shah on the road-side and complained to him about Puran Mal. ‘He has killed our husbands’, they said, ‘put in chains our daughters whom he caused to dance along with the dancing-girls and has seized all our lands and earthly possessions.’ They threatened to accuse the sultan on the day of resurrection if he did not revenge them and, when he reminded them of the ‘oaths and vows’ that had been taken to guarantee the safety of the infidel, they told him to consult the ulema of his camp. Apparently Sher Shah simply had to comply with this. The ulema got together and issued a fatwa deciding that Puran Mal deserved death. The camp of the sultan’s new ally was now surrounded by elephants and troops. Seeing this, Puran Mal went into his tent ‘and severed the head of his beloved wife, namely, Ratnavali , brought it before his dear and near ones’ and ordered them likewise to slay their families. In the ensuing fight 10000 soldiers laid down their lives fighting. Abul Fazl denounces Sher Shah for his dishonesty and calls the ulema misguided men.

Reference

Medieval India
Hindu monarchs
History of Madhya Pradesh